Rey Isaac Vaillant (born January 3, 1973 in Santiago de Cuba) is a Cuban baseball player and Olympic gold medalist.

Vaillant is a one time Gold medalist for baseball, winning at the 1996 Summer Olympics.

External links
Olympic Info

1973 births
Living people
Olympic baseball players of Cuba
Baseball players at the 1996 Summer Olympics
Olympic gold medalists for Cuba
Olympic medalists in baseball

Medalists at the 1996 Summer Olympics